Pape N'Diaye Souaré (born 6 June 1990) is a Senegalese professional footballer who plays as a left back for Morecambe.

Club career
Born in Mbao, Pikine Department, Souaré spent his early career with Diambars, Lille II, Lille and Reims.

He moved to Crystal Palace on a three-and-a half-year deal in January 2015 for an undisclosed fee, reported as £3.45 million. He made his Palace debut on 14 February in the fifth round of the FA Cup, a 2–1 home loss to Liverpool, and was described by Dominic Fifield of The Observer as looking "rusty and susceptible".

On 22 January 2016, it was announced that Souaré had signed a new three-and-a half-year contract with Palace. He was sent off on 13 February at the end of a 2–1 loss to Watford at Selhurst Park, for fouling Valon Behrami.

After over a year out of football following a car crash, Souaré made his first appearance on 19 September 2017 in a 1–0 home win over Huddersfield Town in the third round of the EFL Cup. He was praised for his performance by manager Roy Hodgson.

In August 2019, after his contract with Crystal Palace expired, Souaré joined French Ligue 2 club Troyes on a one-season contract with an option of a further 12 months.

In July 2021, having made no appearances for Troyes in the previous season, Souaré trained with the Crystal Palace under-23 squad, with a view to maintain fitness, and appeared in pre-season matches for the side.

On 6 September 2021, Souaré returned to England to join League One club Charlton Athletic on a one-year deal. On 10 May 2022, it was confirmed that Souaré would leave Charlton Athletic when his contract expired at the end of the season.

On 17 March 2023, Souaré joined League One club Morecambe on a contract until the end of the season.

International career
Souaré made his international debut for Senegal on 29 February 2012, in a goalless friendly draw against South Africa at the Moses Mabhida Stadium in Durban. He later competed at the 2012 Summer Olympics, and was a squad member at the 2015 Africa Cup of Nations. He scored his first international goal from a 20-yard free kick on 29 March 2016 as the Lions de Teranga won 2–1 away to Niger in 2017 Africa Cup of Nations qualification. Following his car crash, he returned to the national team in March 2018.

He was not included in Senegal's squad for the 2018 FIFA World Cup.

Personal life
On 11 September 2016, Souaré was airlifted to hospital after being involved in a road accident on the M4. He sustained injuries to his thigh and jawbone. It was thought that he would be out for six months, although he returned to training after 11 months.

Career statistics

International goals

Scores and results list Senegal's goal tally first.

Honours
Lille
Ligue 1: 2010–11

Crystal Palace
FA Cup runner-up: 2015–16

References

External links

 
 

1990 births
Living people
People from Dakar Region
Association football fullbacks
Senegalese footballers
Diambars FC players
Lille OSC players
Stade de Reims players
Crystal Palace F.C. players
ES Troyes AC players
Charlton Athletic F.C. players
Morecambe F.C. players
Ligue 1 players
Premier League players
Ligue 2 players
Senegalese expatriate footballers
Senegalese expatriate sportspeople in France
Expatriate footballers in France
Senegalese expatriate sportspeople in England
Expatriate footballers in England
Senegal international footballers
Olympic footballers of Senegal
Footballers at the 2012 Summer Olympics
2015 Africa Cup of Nations players
FA Cup Final players
English Football League players